Mad Mad World is an entertainment-comedy panel show broadcast on ITV, presented by comedian Paddy McGuinness, featuring team captains Rufus Hound and Rhys Darby, and regular panellist Rob Rouse. The show began airing on 30 June 2012 and finished abruptly on 11 August 2012 with a regular slot on Saturday late nights. Each episode features three celebrity guests from the world of television, news and comedy, who attempt to answer questions on topics from all around the world. The series was originally due to be shown on 14 April 2012, but was postponed as a consequence of 2012's scheduling shenanigans between Britain's Got Talent and The Voice UK. It eventually emerged after Euro 2012, still in a late-evening slot.

Episode guide
The coloured backgrounds denote the result of each of the shows:

 – Indicates Rhys' team won.
 – Indicates Rufus and Rob's team won.

References

External links

2010s British comedy television series
2012 British television series debuts
2012 British television series endings
British panel games
2010s British game shows
ITV comedy
ITV panel games
Television game shows with incorrect disambiguation